Lorne Charles Webster (born September 19, 1928 – December 15, 2004) was a Canadian financier, businessman and philanthropist. He was the chairman and founder of Prenor Group Limited, a conglomerate with over $500 million in assets that had investments in insurance, trust services, investment management and real estate in Canada, the United States and Europe. He was also the co-owner and co-founder of the Montreal Expos.

Early life and education 
Webster was born in Montreal, Quebec in 1928 and educated at Lower Canada College and McGill University. He started his career at his family's business, Canadian Import, a petroleum company.

Career 
Webster was a director of Bank of Montreal, Domtar, Murphy Oil, Québecor and Dale-Ross Holdings.

Real Estate 
Webster was a longtime business partner of real estate investor René G. Lépine. In 1969, Webster and Lépine purchased the 140-unit apartment building Tour Horizon at 1212 Pine Avenue in Montreal for $3 million. The same year, they purchased the 181-unit apartment building Le Cartier Tower at 1115 Sherbrooke Street in Montreal from the Montreal Trust Company out of receivership for $6 million. Both buildings had high vacancies and were renovated extensively. In 1971, Lépine and Webster wanted to purchase the Van Horne Mansion, adjacent to Le Cartier, and were planning a $7 million office building development. Lépine purchased the Webster family's shares of Le Cartier Tower in 2005.

Personal life 
His paternal grandfather was Lorne Campbell Webster. His maternal grandfather was Charles Frosst, founder of the company that became Merck Frosst.

References 

20th-century Canadian businesspeople
1928 births
2004 deaths

Montreal Expos owners
Sportspeople from Montreal
McGill University alumni
Directors of Bank of Montreal
Quebecor people
Canadian financial company founders